A newspaper stamp is a special type of postage stamp used to pay the cost of mailing newspapers and other periodicals. Although many types were issued in the 19th century, typically representing rates reduced from regular mail, they generally fell out of use in the mid-20th century, as mail services began to arrange bulk handling directly with publishers.

The exact use of newspaper stamps varied; small-value stamps were generally intended to be affixed to newspaper wrappers, in much the fashion of regular mail, but with values usually less than regular stamps. Higher values were used on bundles of newspapers, and later on receipts.

The first newspaper stamp was issued by Austria in 1851, and a number of nations soon followed suit. The newspaper stamps of the United States, in use from 1865 to 1898, were always intended for bulk shipments, and with face values ranging up to US$100, are the highest-value newspaper stamps.

Newspaper stamps seem to have been printed in great quantities, and almost all types are today inexpensive and easily acquired.

Further reading 
 Chandler, John H. and H. Dagnall. The Newspaper and Almanac Stamps of Great Britain and Ireland. Saffron Walden: GB Philatelic Society, 1981  302p.
 Frankl, T. Die Zeitungsstempel und Die Stempelmarken Österreichs = The Newspaper Stamps and Stamp Cancellations of Austria. Prague: Der 'Briefmarke' Teplitz-Schönau, 1927 36p.
 Jorgensen, Lars. Danmarks Avisportomaerker = The Newspaper Stamps of Denmark. Overijse: L. Jorgensen, 2004  195p.
 Noël, Gilbert. Catalogue des Timbres de Journaux de France. Paris: Histoire postale, 1975 47p.
 O'Neill, C.P. The Newspaper Stamps of Ireland. Enniskillen: Watergate Press, 1978 57p.
 Pepper, Doc M. United States Newspaper Stamps 1865-1895: The Regulars: a study of the regular issues. [League City, TX: Doc M. Pepper, 2010 24p.
 Red and Black: The Duty and Postage Stamps Impressed on Newspapers, 1712-1870, and on 'The Times' or its postal wrappers from 1785 to 1962. London: Times Publishing Company, 1962 22p.

External links 

 Linn's refresher course on newspaper stamps

Philatelic terminology
Stamp